Institute of National Importance (INI) is a status that may be conferred on a premier public higher education institution in India by an act of Parliament of India, an institution which "serves as a pivotal player in developing highly skilled personnel within the specified region of the country/state". Institutes of National Importance receive special recognition, higher autonomy and funding from the Government of India.

Common Acts

Architecture 

Schools of Planning and Architecture (SPA) are declared as Institutes of National Importance through the 'School of Planning and Architecture Act, 2014' and its subsequent amendments.

Design 
National Institutes of Design (NID) are declared as an Institution of National Importance through the  'National Institute of Design Act 2014' and its subsequent amendments.
Footwear Design and Development Institute comprising 12 campuses is declared as an Institution of National Importance through the  'FDDI Act 2017'.

Engineering and Technology  

 Indian Institutes of Technology (IIT) are declared as Institutes of National Importance through the Institutes of Technology Act, 1961 and its subsequent amendments.
 National Institutes of Technology (NIT) are declared as Institutes of National Importance through the National Institutes of Technology, Science Education and Research Act, 2007 and its subsequent amendments.
 Indian Institutes of Information Technology (IIIT) are declared as Institutes of National Importance through the 'Indian Institute of Information Technology Act, 2014' and the 'Indian Institutes of Information Technology (Public-Private Partnership) Act, 2017' and their subsequent amendments.
 Indian Institute of Engineering Science and Technology (IIEST) was declared as an Institute of National Importance in 2014, when the erstwhile Bengal Engineering and Science University converted to a central institution.

Food Technology 
National Institute of Food Technology Entrepreneurship and Management (NIFTEM) and Indian Institute of Food Processing Technology (IIFPT) are declared Institutes of National Importance through the National Institutes of Food Technology, Entrepreneurship and Management Act, 2021.

Management 

Indian Institutes of Management (IIM) are declared as Institutes of National Importance through the Indian Institutes of Management Act, 2017 and its subsequent amendments.

Medicine 
All India Institutes of Medical Sciences (AIIMS) are declared as Institutes of National Importance through the 'All India Institute of Medical Sciences Act, 1956' and its subsequent amendments.

Pharmacy 
National Institutes of Pharmaceutical Education and Research (NIPER) are declared as Institutes of National Importance through the 'National Institute of Pharmaceutical Education and Research Act, 1998' and its subsequent amendments.

Science 

Indian Institutes of Science Education and Research (IISER) are declared as Institutes of National Importance through the amendments in the National Institutes of Technology, Science Education and Research Act, 2007.

Summary statistics 

As of January 2023, there are 165 Institutes of National Importance under various Acts of Parliament. These INIs include: 23 IITs, 19 AIIMSs, 20 IIMs, 31 NITs, 25 IIITs, 7 IISERs, 7 NIPERs, 5 NIDs, 3 SPAs, 2 NIFTEMs, 7 Central universities, 4 Medical research institutes, and 12 other specialized institutes.

Indian Institute of Technology (IITs)

Indian Institute of Management (IIMs)

Indian Institute of Information Technology (IIITs)

Indian Institute of Science Education and Research (IISERs)

All India Institute of Medical Sciences (AIIMSs)

National Institute of Technology (NITs)

National Institute of Design (NIDs)

National Institute of Food Technology Entrepreneurship and Management (NIFTEMs)

National Institute of Pharmaceutical Education and Research (NIPERs)

School of Planning and Architecture (SPAs)

Central Universities

Medical research Institutes

Other Specialized Institutes

Proposed Institutes of National Importance (INIs)
The following institutes have been proposed as INIs through a bill:
 National Council of Educational Research and Training
 Indian National Defence University
 Homi Bhabha National Institute
Indian Institute of Foreign Trade
Indian Institute of Forest Management
Central Institute of Petrochemicals Engineering and Technology

See also 
Ivy League, a formal grouping of leading private universities in the United States
 Imperial Universities, a grouping of older universities in Japan
 Russell Group, a formal grouping of universities in the United Kingdom
 Golden Triangle (English universities), a group of universities in Oxford, Cambridge, London
 SKY (universities), a group of universities in South Korea
TU9, alliance of nine leading Technical Universities in Germany
Double First Class Universities, group of elite universities in China
Institutes of Eminence

Footnotes

References

External links

 Institutions of National Importance at Department of Higher Education, Ministry of Education

Lists of universities and colleges in India
Government universities and colleges in India
India government-related lists